Harry Hill's Deadly Hunt is a 1925 German silent film directed by Lorenz Bätz and Willy Rath and starring Valy Arnheim as the detective Harry Hill, part of a series featuring the character. It was released in two parts, both premiering in February 1925.

Cast
In alphabetical order

References

Bibliography

External links

1925 films
Films of the Weimar Republic
Films directed by Lorenz Bätz
German silent feature films
German black-and-white films